This is a list of submissions to the 63rd Academy Awards for Best Foreign Language Film. The Academy Award for Best Foreign Language Film was created in 1956 by the Academy of Motion Picture Arts and Sciences to honour non-English-speaking films produced outside the United States. The award is handed out annually, and is accepted by the winning film's director, although it is considered an award for the submitting country as a whole. Countries are invited by the Academy to submit their best films for competition according to strict rules, with only one film being accepted from each country.

For the 63rd Academy Awards, thirty-seven films were submitted in the category Academy Award for Best Foreign Language Film. The five nominated films came from China, France, Germany, Italy and the eventual winner, Journey of Hope from Switzerland. Chile and Germany submitted films for the first time. Germany had previously submitted as East Germany and West Germany.

Submissions

Notes
 Ju Dou became the first Chinese film to be nominated for an Oscar, despite China's flip-flop over whether it even wanted the film in the competition. The film was officially selected by China's national film board, which later unsuccessfully tried to persuade the Academy to withdraw the film.
 The 1981 Romanian film Carnival Scenes had been banned in Romania and was not released in local theatres. Since the film had never been released, the Academy initially accepted it as a new film. However, while the film was listed on AMPAS' Fall 1991 press release, it was not listed in a 2007 updated list. It is unknown whether the film actually screened or was disqualified.

References
General

Specific

63